Letica is a surname. Notable people with the surname include:

 Dušan Letica (1884–1945), Serbian soldier, lawyer, and politician
 Evgenije Letica (1858–1933), Serbian theologian and metropolitan 
 Karlo Letica (born 1997), Croatian footballer
 Slaven Letica (1947-2020), Croatian author and politician
 Sveto Letica (1926–2001), Croatian admiral

Croatian surnames
Serbian surnames